Tlachichilco is a small town in Veracruz, Mexico. It is located in the northern part of Veracruz, in the region known as Huasteca Baja. . It is one of the 212 municipalities of Veracruz. Tlachichilco is made up of 32 small towns in which more than 10,000 people live.

References

Populated places in Veracruz